Arcapillin is an α-glucosidase and protein tyrosine phosphatase inhibitor isolated from Artemisia capillaris.

References

Phosphatase inhibitors
Flavones